Ignacio Lugo (born 19 December 1932) is a Venezuelan wrestler. He competed in the men's freestyle featherweight at the 1952 Summer Olympics.

References

1932 births
Living people
Venezuelan male sport wrestlers
Olympic wrestlers of Venezuela
Wrestlers at the 1952 Summer Olympics
Place of birth missing (living people)